Annonamine is a benzylisoquinoline alkaloid isolated from Annona muricata (commonly known as soursop, graviola, guanabana, paw-paw and sirsak), a plant commonly used in folk medicine by indigenous communities in Africa and South America.
Structurally, it contains an aporphine core featuring a quaternary ammonium group.

See also
 Asimilobine - amine not quaternized
 Anonaine
 Pukateine

References

Aporphine alkaloids